Charbonneau is a surname of French origin given as a nickname for someone with a dark complexion. People with that name include:

Agnes Charbonneau (1897–1957), American politician
 Arthur Charbonneau (born 1939), Canadian politician
Bernard Charbonneau, French writer
Christine Charbonneau (born 1943), Canadian songwriter and singer
Danielle Charbonneau (born 1953), Canadian radio personality
David Charbonneau (born 1974), Canadian astronomer
Ed Charbonneau, American politician
Eileen Charbonneau, American novelist
Éric Charbonneau (born 1969), Canadian politician
France Charbonneau, Canadian judge
Francine Charbonneau (born 1962), Canadian politician
Guy Charbonneau (1922–1998), Canadian politician and speaker of the Canadian Senate
Henry Charbonneau (1913–1982), French far right politician and writer
Howie Charbonneau (born 1955), American soccer player
Jacques Charbonneau, Canadian politician
Jean Charbonneau (1875–1960), Canadian poet
Jean Baptiste Charbonneau (1805–1866), American explorer, son of Sacagawea and Toussaint Charbonneau
Jean-Pierre Charbonneau (born 1950), Canadian politician
Joe Charboneau (born 1955), American baseball player
José Charbonneau (born 1966), Canadian ice hockey player
Joseph Charbonneau (1892–1959), Canadian archbishop
Kate Charbonneau (born 1993), Canadian figure skater
Kevin Charbonneau, Poet
Monique Charbonneau (1928–2014), Canadian artist
Napoléon Charbonneau (1853–1916), Canadian lawyer, judge, and politician
Olivier Charbonneau (1613–1687), French first settler of Île Jésus, Canada
Pascal Charbonneau (born 1983), Canadian chess grandmaster
Patricia Charbonneau (born 1959), American actress
Paul-Émile Charbonneau (born 1922), Canadian bishop
René Charbonneau, 17th-century French medical missionary
Simon Charbonneau-Campeau (born 1988), Canadian football player
Stéphane Charbonneau (born 1970), Canadian ice hockey player
Steve Charbonneau (born 1973), Canadian football player
Toussaint Charbonneau (1767–1843), Canadian explorer and member of the Lewis & Clark Expedition
Yvon Charbonneau (1940-2016), Canadian politician

See also
 Carbonneau (disambiguation), including people with that surname
 Charbonneau (disambiguation)
 Sacagawea, wife of Toussaint Charbonneau

References

French-language surnames